The Central Band of the Royal Malay Regiment is the official central band of the Malaysian Army's Royal Malay Regiment that is dedicated to providing ceremonial honours and music to the Yang di-Pertuan Agong, the Prime Minister, the Chief Justice, the President of the Senate, and the Speaker of the House of Representatives. It is the Army's seniormost band. It is considered the equivalent to the 5 regimental bands of the Foot Guards.

Characteristics 
As a Commonwealth member, Malaysia sports military bands that are very similar to the British as well as other commonwealth countries. This is especially true in the case of the Band of the Royal Malay Regiment, which fields their percussion section (specifically snare drums) at the front similar to the Royal Marines. It is also of the few commonwealth military bands that use sousaphones when on parade, with others including New Zealand, Singapore and Fiji.

Obligations 

Among their obligations are the following:

 Maintain a musical presence at military parades
 Honoring foreign heads of state on their state visits to Federal Territory of Kuala Lumpur 
 Support the everyday ceremonial activities of the Regiment
 Support the all ceremonial activities of the state
 Performing drill at military tattoos domestically and internationally

In 2008, the PPRAMD was invited to perform in the United Kingdom, performing at Royal Tattoo at Windsor Castle, at the Household Division Beating Retreat on Horse Guards Parade, and the mounting of the Queen's Guard at Buckingham Palace. Domestically, the PPRAMD was responsible for according state visits for foreign leaders, such as King Salman, President Emmanuel Macron, and President Barack Obama. During all of the arrival honors for the mentioned leaders, Menjunjung Duli was played by the PPRAMD during the inspection of the guard of honour. In supporting all events of national importance, the PPRAMD is always seen at high level occasions, such as the Installation of the Yang di-Pertuan Agong and the Opening of Parliament.

Organization 
 Unit HQ 
 Marching Band
 Brass fanfare section 
 Corps of Drums 
 Symphonic Band
 Pipe band
 Big band

Pipes and Drums 
The Pipes and Drums of the Central Band are made up of personnel who belong to the Malacca-based 5th Battalion, RMR and is platoon-sized. It was founded in 1953 when an officer of the King's Own Scottish Borderers (an affiliated British Regiment) was seconded to form a pipe platoon. The officer, who was in fact Scottish himself, introduced the ethnically Malay members of the regiment to bagpipe training. At present, the pipes and drums of the current Royal Regiment of Scotland and the RMR have maintained their historical alliance alongside the larger regiment. The platoon has done many events, being invited to the Edinburgh Festival many times, with the last time being in January 1990, on the occasion of the KOSB’s 300th regimental anniversary.

References

External links 

 Bands performances of the Malay Regiment at Buckingham Palace, London 
 Askar Melayu Pancaragam Melaka Parade
 The PPRAMD in a concert setting

Military units and formations of Malaysia
Military bands
Malaysian Army